The Denmark men's national pitch and putt team represents Denmark in the pitch and putt international competitions. It is managed by the Dansk Pitch and Putt Union (DPPU), that was member of the European Pitch and Putt Association, and associated member of the Federation of International Pitch and Putt Associations (FIPPA). 

Denmark has played once the Pitch and Putt World Cup, in 2006, with a 12th place.

In 2009, vacated their membership of FIPPA and EPPA and joined another international association, IPPA.

National team

Players
National team in the World Cup 2006
Søren Rasmussen
Stephen Carden 	  	  	 
Peter Staal

Notes and references

See also
World Cup Team Championship
European Team Championship

External links
DPPU Dansk Pitch and Putt Union

National pitch and putt teams
Pitch and putt